Rock-N-Roll Family is a dance competition and singing competition show which first broadcast on Zee TV, the date it first broadcast on is 15 March 2008 'til 14 June 2008. The 'Grand-Finale' of the show was held in Indore, Madhya Pradesh on 14 June 2008. It is first of its kind show that will target audience of all age groups and all segments of Indian society. Like from most of the other reality shows, Rock-N-Roll Family will be different because it will create a platform where 3 generation of family members will be able to participate.  It will broadcast every Saturday and Sunday. The judges of the shows were the Bollywood actors Ajay Devgn, Kajol and Tanuja, all of whom are related to each other.

Besides that the families will have to perform different acts based on popular music on various themes. Judgment will be on the basis of scores by an esteemed panel of judges from entertainment industry and through audience votes.

Judges

Kajol
Ajay Devgn
Tanuja

Hosts

Sharad Kelkar 
Mauli Dave

Winner

 Roy Family from Kolkata won with 5,37,110 votes.

Grand-Finale Voting/Final Decision

 North Zone Results♥  No.1: Saxena Family♥  No.2: Bhalke Family♥  No.3: Roy Family

 Central Zone Results♥  No.1:Bhalke Family♥  No.2: Roy Family♥  No.3: Saxena Family

 East & South Zone Results♥  No.1:Roy Family♥  No.2:Saxena Family♥  No.3: Bhalke Family

Total Votes
 Roy Family --- 5,37,109
 Bhalke Family --- 5,26,304
 Saxena Family --- 4,97,214

Rock-N-Roll Family Awards
 Best Dada: Mr. Bhalakrishan Bhalke
 Best Dadi: Mrs. Shanti Saxena
 Best Papa: Mr. Jackie Roy
 Best Mommy: Mrs. Puja Kohli
 Best Child: Shivantika Saxena

Contestants
Originals

Wildcard entrants

Celebrity Guests
Week 2:21 March 2008 --- Sunil Shetty, Tusshar Kapoor, & Sameera Reddy
Week 3:29 March 2008 --- Tanisha Mukherjee
Week 4:4 April 2008 --- Ajay Devgan's family
Week 6:18 April 2008 --- Jeetendra & Esha Deol
Week 11:24 May 2008 ---  Karan Johar
Week 12:30 May 2008 --- Harbhajan Singh
Week 13:7 June 2008 --- Ayesha Takia & also Sanobar Kabir, Kashmera Shah, & Sambhavna Singh
Week 14:13 June 2008 --- Tanisha Mukherjee
Grand-Finale:14 June 2008 --- Amita Pathak, Nikul Mehta, & Adhyayan Suman star cast from movie Haale Dil; also presented the Rock-N-Roll Family awards.

External links
Rock-N-Roll Family Official Site
Official Site for Voting Contestants

Indian reality television series
Zee TV original programming
2008 Indian television series debuts
2008 Indian television series endings
Ajay Devgn